Yumi's Cells is a 2021 South Korean television series directed by Lee Sang-yeob and starring Kim Go-eun, Ahn Bo-hyun, Park Jin-young, Lee Yu-bi, and Park Ji-hyun. Based on the eponymous webtoon, it is a cell-based psychological romance that unravels the daily life of an ordinary office worker Yumi through the eyes of the cells in her head. The series premiered on tvN on September 17, 2021, and aired every Friday and Saturday at 22:50 (KST). It was also released simultaneously on both online streaming services TVING and iQIYI.

On September 8, 2021, TVING announced that the drama had sold broadcast rights in more than 160 countries around the world, including Europe, North America and Southeast Asia.

The second season premiered exclusively on TVING on June 10, 2022, releasing two episodes every Friday at 16:00 (KST). It was later aired on tvN from November 16, 2022, every Wednesday and Thursday at 22:30 (KST).

On September 15, 2022, it was announced that season 2 had been sold to Amazon Prime Video for broadcasting in Japan. Season 2 was also available on Amazon Prime Video in Indonesia, Thailand and the Philippines.

Series overview

Synopsis

Season 1
The drama tells the story of an ordinary office worker from the perspective of the brain cells in her head that control her every thought, feeling and action.

Yumi (Kim Go-eun) is an ordinary woman. Her love-cell falls into a coma following the shock of a failed relationship. The drama will depict her growth and transformation as her cells work hard to wake up the love cell.

Goo Woong (Ahn Bo-hyun) is a game developer who is an engineer to the core. Although he doesn't speak emotionally, he tries to wake up Yumi's love-cell with his simple and honest personality.

Season 2
After parting with Goo Woong, Yumi starts a new relationship with her co-worker Babi (Jinyoung) but they start to have issues after some time when he doesn't tell her the truth about certain things.

Cast

Main
 Kim Go-eun as Kim Yumi, an ordinary office worker.
 Ahn Bo-hyun as Goo Woong, a game developer and Yumi's second boyfriend and Sae-yi's love interest.
 Jun Ho-young as teen Goo Woong
 Park Jin-young as Yoo Babi, Yumi's co-worker and boyfriend.
 Park Ji-hyun as Seo Sae-yi, Goo Woong's colleague. She dreams of becoming the best game art director.
 Lee Yu-bi as Ruby, Yumi's co-worker who prides herself on mastering various dating techniques.

Yumi's cells
 Love Cell (voice: Ahn Soi)
Yumi's prime cell that represents the people. It's the driving force behind Yumi's actions. Other cells wear blue, but it wears pink.
 Emotional Cell (voice: Park Ji-yoon)
Emotional cell, responsible for emotion. It has a nocturnal temperament, so at night, it flutters blue leaves and gets wet with sensitivity.
 Rational Cell (voice: Shim Kyu-hyuk)
The opposite cell responsible for ideal thinking. When working or having an important conversation, this is Yumi's busiest cell from the moment she wakes up to the moment she goes to sleep.
 Hungry Cell (voice: Lee Jang-won)
Cell responsible for appetite and cravings. When this cell wakes up, Yumi's appetite explodes.
 Naughty Cell (voice: Ahn Young-mi)
Clumsy sexuality cell that promotes racy thoughts. It spits out obscene words from time to time, most of which are muted.
 Detective Cell (voice: Jeong Jae-heon)
Detective cell that analyzes and predicts people and situations around it. Serious reasoning with a tragic appearance.
 Fashion Cell (voice: Kim Yeon-woo)
Fashion cell responsible for the sense of fashion.
 Hysterious (voice: Um Sang-hyun)
Hysterious is responsible for hysteria.
 Anxiety Cell (voice: Sa Moon-yeong)
Cell responsible for anxiety. It senses anxiety and even helps Yumi.
 Inner Feeling Cell (voice: Sa Moon-yeong)
 Rampage Cell (voice: Jeong Jae-heon)
 Fussy Cell (voice: Sa Moon-yeong)
 Lullaby Cell (voice: Jeong Jae-heon)
 Cheapskate Cell (voice: Ahn Soi)
 Reaction Doll No.1 (voice: Ahn Soi)
 Stomach Cell (voice: Shim Kyu-hyuk)
 I've-Seen-It-Somewhere Cell
 Cleaning Cell
 Tongue Cells (voice: Yoo Se-yoon)

Goo Woong's cells
 Rational Cell (voice: Um Sang-hyun)
 Humor Cell (voice: Jeong Jae-heon)
 Love Cell

Babi's cells
 Tongue Cells (voice: Kang Yu-mi)

Supporting
 Joo Jong-hyuk as Louis
A game developer workaholic. Goo Woong, Seo Sae-yi, and he were college classmates, who have set up and run an online game company.
 Jung Soon-won as Nam Joo-hyuk, Chief Nam.
 Kim Cha-yoon as Lee Bonnie, an employee of Daehan Noodles' marketing department.
 Mi Ram as Aida, Yumi's only friend and her co-worker.

Others
 Season 1–2
 Yoon Yoo-sun as Yumi's mother
 Sung Ji-ru as Yumi's father
 Kwon Seung-woo as Kang Han-byeol, Assistant Manager of Daehan Noodles' marketing department
 Kim Mi-soo as Ja-young, Babi's ex-girlfriend
 Season 1
 Park Bo-eun as Information desk employee (ep. 8)
 Jung Soo-ji as Si Leon (ep. 7–8)
 Kim Hye-in as Hong Na-ri (ep. 7–8)
 Jo Mo-se as wedding guest (ep. 13)
 Kang Chan-yang as grocery store cashier (ep. 11)

Special appearance
 Season 1
 Choi Min-ho as Chae U-gi, Yumi's co-worker and unreciprocated crush.
 Ahn Young-mi as Nung-cheol (Voice)
 Lee Sang-yi as Ji Wu-gi, Yumi's ex-boyfriend.
 Season 2
 Shin Ye-eun as Yoo Da-eun, part-time worker at Jeju branch of Daehan Noodles.
 Pyo Ji-hoon as Control Z, an illustrator who works with Yumi.
 Jeon Seok-ho as Ahn Dae-young, editor-in-chief of Julie's Literature History.

Production

Casting
On December 31, 2020, it was reported that webtoon Yumi's Cells published on Naver by Lee Dong-gun with 3.2 billion accumulated views was being made into a television series and Kim Go-eun was confirmed as the female lead. In April 2021, the lead cast line-up was announced as Kim Go-eun, Ahn Bo-hyun, Lee Yu-bi, and Park Ji-hyun.

Filming
Filming of the series began in April 2021. On June 18, Ahn Bo-hyun revealed in an interview that he was currently filming Yumi's Cells and he has developed naturally tanned skin tone for the role of Goo Woong.

Animation
Yumi's Cells is being produced using a new format which combines live-action and 3D animation. It is the first time in a Korean drama that such a format is used to produce a TV series while using the Unreal Engine as its source. The 3D animation is produced by Locus Corporation (also known as Sidus Animation Studios), the producer of Red Shoes and the Seven Dwarfs, which is also producing an animated feature film based on the property with Studio N.

Original soundtrack

Season 1

Part 1

Part 2

Part 3

Part 4

Part 5

Part 6

Part 7

Part 8

Part 9

Part 10

Part 11

Season 2

Part 1

Part 2

Part 3

Part 4

Part 5

Part 6

Part 7

Part 8

Viewership

Season 1

The release of the second season on June 10 saw the number of TVING's paid subscribers increasing by more than 60% from the first to the second week, and the series took first place among all the platform original contents for five weeks in a row.

Season 2

Awards

Listicle

References

External links
 
 
 Yumi's Cells (Season 1) at Daum 
 Yumi's Cells (Season 2) at Daum 
 
 Yumi's Cells on iQIYI

TVN (South Korean TV channel) television dramas
2021 South Korean television series debuts
2022 South Korean television series endings
Korean-language television shows
South Korean romance television series
Television series by Studio Dragon
South Korean web series
Television series by Studio N (Naver)
Television shows based on South Korean webtoons
TVING original programming